Helen Elleker (born 1956) is a former female track and field athlete who competed for England in the walking events.

Athletics career
Elleker was three times English champion after winning the 1984, 1985 and 1986 AAA Championships in the 10,000 metres walk.

Elleker represented England in the 10,000 metres walk event, at the 1990 Commonwealth Games in Auckland, New Zealand.

References

1956 births
Living people
Commonwealth Games competitors for England
British female racewalkers
English female racewalkers
Athletes (track and field) at the 1990 Commonwealth Games